Cook Summit is the highest peak in the Solvay Mountains, Brabant Island, rising to  between Galen Peak and Celsus Peak. It was named by the UK Antarctic Place-Names Committee in 1986 after Dr. Frederick A. Cook, an American polar explorer and surgeon with the Belgian Antarctic Expedition, 1897–99, led by Lieutenant Adrien de Gerlache.

References
 

Mountains of the Palmer Archipelago